June Marlowe (born Gisela Valaria Goetten, November 6, 1903 – March 10, 1984) was an American film actress who began her career during the silent film era. She was best known for her performance of "Miss Crabtree" in the Our Gang shorts.

Career
Marlowe was born to German parents in St. Cloud, Minnesota. She was a prolific actress in silent films during the 1920s, appearing in films opposite John Barrymore and Rin Tin Tin. She began her acting career shortly after her 1923 graduation from Hollywood High School, and was signed to a contract by Warner Brothers in 1924.

In 1925, she became one of the WAMPAS Baby Stars. In 1928, she was an actress under contract with Universal Studios. Her career did well until the introduction of talkies. Marlowe did not make an easy transition, and by 1930 she was starting to drift away from acting.

By chance, she happened to meet director Robert F. McGowan one day in a Los Angeles, California, department store. McGowan was searching for an actress to portray the schoolteacher in the Our Gang series of children's comedies. After producer Hal Roach suggested that brunette Marlowe don a blonde wig to match the hair of the lead kid in the series, Jackie Cooper, she was given the part of Miss Crabtree.

Marlowe and Cooper were paired together in three Our Gang films, Teacher's Pet, School's Out and Love Business. She also had a small role in 1931's Little Daddy. In addition to her work in Our Gang, Marlowe appeared in fellow Roach stars Laurel and Hardy's first feature film, Pardon Us.

Marlowe's Miss Crabtree character was used in only two more shorts, 1931's Shiver My Timbers and 1932's Readin' and Writin'. After Cooper left Our Gang in 1931 she appeared in MGM features.

Later years and death
In an October 19731 notice, Washington's Evening Star newspaper announced that the Superior Court in Los Angeles "returned a verdict of $100 damages to Henry M. Oviatt against June Marlowe, film actress, and her brother, Armour Marlowe, as the outgrowth of a motor car collision," adding that their automobile had "collided with one containing Oviatt and Mrs. Nellie McLaren, who sued for $5,000 each, alleging injuries", and that "Mrs. McLaren was denied damages."

On July 2, 1933, Marlowe married Hollywood businessman Rodney Sprigg and retired from motion pictures to become a housewife. The couple remained married until Sprigg's death in 1982. In her later years, she suffered from Parkinson's disease, dying from complications on March 10, 1984.

Marlowe was originally buried at the San Fernando Mission Cemetery. She was later re-interred in the Cathedral of Our Lady of the Angels.

In popular culture
The name of schoolteacher Edna Krabappel, a cartoon character from the animated television series The Simpsons, was chosen by early Simpsons writers Wallace Wolodarsky and Jay Kogen in 1990 as a play on the fruit "crabapple" and as a reference to Miss Crabtree from the Our Gang shorts.

June Marlowe's Our Gang character Miss Crabtree was mentioned in "Buddy", a track on De La Soul's album 3 Feet High and Rising.

Filmography

References

External links

1903 births
1984 deaths
20th-century American actresses
Actresses from Minnesota
American film actresses
American people of German descent
American silent film actresses
Burials at the Cathedral of Our Lady of the Angels
Neurological disease deaths in California
Deaths from Parkinson's disease
Film serial actresses
Hal Roach Studios actors
People from St. Cloud, Minnesota
Western (genre) film actresses
WAMPAS Baby Stars